Dano, also called Surit-nal, is a Korean traditional holiday that falls on the 5th day of the fifth month of the lunar Korean calendar. It is an official holiday in North Korea and one of the major traditional holidays in South Korea. South Korea has retained several festivals related to the holiday, one of which is Gangneung Dano Festival (Hangul: 강릉단오제) designated by UNESCO as a "Intangible Cultural Heritage of Humanity".

In the Mahan confederacy of ancient Korea, this was a day of spiritual rites, and enjoyment with song, dance, and wine. Traditionally, women washed their hair in water boiled with Sweet Flag (changpo), believed to make one's hair shiny. Women also put Angelica polymorpha flowers in their hair out of the belief that its aroma would repel evil. People wore blue and red clothes and dyed hairpins red with the iris roots. Men wore iris roots around their waist to ward off evil spirits. Herbs wet with dew on this morning were said to heal stomachaches and wounds. Traditional foods include surichitteok, ssuktteok, and other herb rice cakes.

The persisting folk games of Dano are the swing, ssireum, stone battle game seokjeon and taekkyon. The swing was a game played by women, while ssireum was a wrestling match among men. In addition, mask dance used to be popular among peasants due to its penchant for satirical lyrics flouting local aristocrats.

Etymology 

Dano is also called Surit-nal, which means high day or the day of god. The word surit harks back to suri, meaning "wheel," which is why the rice cakes were marked with a wheel pattern.

Origin 
Modern history tends to characterize Dano to be a shamanistic ritual worshipping the sky deity in celebration of the end of sowing season. According to the article A Comparative Study of the Tano Festivals between Korea and China, the people of Mahan confederacy celebrated day and night with dancing and singing after the sowing season in May. In the ancient state of Jinhan, a rite to heaven was held after the sowing of the seeds in May. It is said this custom was passed on to Silla and was venerated as Dano. In the northern regions living creatures wake from their winter sleep in May, so Dano was originally a holiday celebrated in the northern part of the country. Since the Three Kingdoms of Korea era, the ancestral god also became an object of sacrifice. For example, in Gaya, Dano was one of five annual rituals for Suro, the legendary ancestor of Gaya. Since then, more emphasis was given to the ancestral rituals. Originally called Surit-nal, the new name Dano, derived from the Duanwu Festival, was adopted during Joseon Dynasty along with the exact date of celebration.

See also 
 Dragon Boat Festival
List of festivals in Asia
List of festivals in South Korea
List of Korean traditional festivals
Public holidays in North Korea
Traditional Korean holidays

References

 The Academy of Korean Studies, ed. (1991), "Dano of May", Encyclopedia of Korean People and Culture, Woongjin (in Korean)

External links

Information about Dano
Information about Dano
Gallery of Dano

Korean words and phrases
Public holidays in Korea
Festivals in Korea
Religious festivals in South Korea
May observances
June observances
Folk festivals in South Korea
Observances set by the Korean calendar